The Tejano Music Award for Best New Artist is an honor presented annually at the Tejano Music Awards, a ceremony that recognizes emerging vocalists and groups in the Tejano music industry. The award is given out in three subcategories: Male, Female, and Group.

Tristan Ramos, who won Best New Male Artist in 2019 at the age of 13, became one of the youngest recipients of a Tejano Music Award since its inception in 1981. Mia, who won Best New Female Artist in 2018 at the age of 11, is the youngest recipient of any Tejano Music Award. Mia had broken the record for the youngest winner one year after Isabel Marie Sanchez held the title in 2017.

Recipients

Best New Artist — Male

Best New Artist — Female

Best New Artist — Group

See also 

Music of Texas

References 

General
  

Specific

Works cited

External links
Official site of the Tejano Music Awards

Tejano Music Awards
Awards established in 2009
Music awards honoring women